Arbër is an Albanian masculine given name and may refer to:
Arbër Abilaliaj (born 1986), Albanian footballer 
Arbër Aliu (born 1988), Albanian footballer
Arbër Allkanjari (born 1989), Albanian footballer
Arbër Basha (born 1998), Albanian footballer
Arber Bellegu (born 2000), German-Kosovar professional boxer
Arbër Çyrbja (born 1993), Albanian footballer
Arbër Dhrami (born 1988), Albanian footballer
Arbër Zeneli (born 1995), Swedish-Kosovar footballer

Albanian masculine given names